Shabash is a live album by Russian rock band Alisa. It was released on 25 April 1991. The album was recorded at the Luzhniki Stadium in Moscow on 28 October 1990. The concert was part of the Shabash Tour, which ran between 1989 and 1991.

The album was dedicated to Alisa bandleader Konstantin Kinchev's friend Alexander Bashlachev, who had died three years before the album release, and the title is taken from the last syllable of his nickname and the first of his surname (Sasha Bashlachev). It is the first double live album in the history of Russian rock music. In 1996, Kinchev stated that Shabash was the band's best album.

The songs performed at the concert were written between 1986 and 1990.

Track listing

Personnel 
 Konstantin Kinchev - vocals, acoustic guitar
 Igor Chumychkin - guitar
 Andrei Shatalin - guitar
 Peter Samoilov - bass, backing vocals
 Mikhail Nefedov - drums
 Andrei Korolev - keyboards, backing vocals

Release history 
The album was first released on 25 April 1991 as a double vinyl set, pressed by the Aprelevsky vinyl factory. In 1993, it was released on CD by A-Ram Records, which inverted the colours on the cover and omitted track 11, "Vse eto rok-n-roll". In 1993, Alisa signed to Moroz Records, who released the album on cassette. In 1996, the album was released by Zvukoreki, which included the first CD-release of "Vse eto rok-n-roll". In 2009, the album was released on Real Records as two discs. The album was reissued on vinyl in 2014 for Alisa's 30th anniversary. In 2016, Misteriya Zvuka reissued the album as part of their ongoing reissue campaign of Alisa's discography.

External links 
 Shabash at Discogs (list of versions)

1991 live albums